Andrea Daravy Ka (born 25 April 1992) is a Cambodian former tennis player.

Ka has career-high WTA rankings of 560 in singles, reached in June 2018, and 466 in doubles, achieved on 24 September 2018. She is the first Cambodian tennis player to win an ITF tennis tournament.

In 2017, Ka won a bronze medal in the women's singles event at the 2017 Southeast Asian Games. She also represented Cambodia at the 2014 Asian Games in Incheon.

ITF Career finals

Singles: 2 (2 titles)

Doubles: 11 (7 titles, 4 runner–ups)

References

External links
 
 

1992 births
Living people
Cambodian female tennis players
French female tennis players
Khmer people
Sportspeople from Nogent-sur-Marne
Southeast Asian Games bronze medalists for Cambodia
Southeast Asian Games medalists in tennis
Competitors at the 2017 Southeast Asian Games
Tennis players at the 2014 Asian Games
Asian Games competitors for Cambodia